Pizzey Memorial Clock is a heritage-listed memorial originally located at 63 Churchill Street, Childers, Bundaberg Region, Queensland, Australia. It was added to the Queensland Heritage Register on 21 August 1992 but was removed from the register in June 2015 after it was reconstructed at the Childers Historical Village.

History 
The memorial clock commemorated Jack Pizzey, who was Premier of Queensland from 17 January 1968 until his death on 31 July that same year. Pizzey was born in Childers and was the Member of the Queensland Legislative Assembly for the local seat of Isis.

In 2000-2001, the Isis Shire Council decided to redevelop that section of Churchill Street to create the Millennium Park which would include a monument to the Kanaka workers as its feature. The Pizzey Memorial Clock was relocated to the Childers Historical Village in Taylor Street.

Heritage listing 
The Pizzey Memorial Clock was listed on the Queensland Heritage Register on 21 August 1992 as being important in demonstrating the evolution of Queensland's history. However, its relocation and reconstruction were seen as grounds to remove it from the register.

References

Attribution

External links
 
 

Queensland Heritage Register
Childers, Queensland
Monuments and memorials in Queensland
Articles incorporating text from the Queensland Heritage Register